Calliostoma tupinamba is a species of sea snail, a marine gastropod mollusc in the family Calliostomatidae.

Distribution
This marine species is endemic to  Southeastern Brazil.

Description
The shell of this species can reach 38 mm in height with colors ranging from tawny brown to pinkish brown. The shell also has spot that range from white and dark red to purple with a purple apex and numerous white dots on the beads.

References

tupinamba
Gastropods described in 2012